Cancel culture is a phenomenon in which those who are deemed to have acted or spoken in an unacceptable manner are ostracized, boycotted or shunned. This shunning may extend to social or professional circles—whether on social media or in person—with most high-profile incidents involving celebrities. Those subject to this ostracism are said to have been "cancelled". 

The expression "cancel culture" came in circulation in the late 2010s and early 2020s and has mostly negative connotations, often used polemically by self-described advocates for free speech and against censorship. The term "call-out culture" is generally understood to be a more positive framing of the same concept.

Some critics argue that cancel culture has a chilling effect on public discourse, is unproductive, does not bring real social change, causes intolerance, and amounts to cyberbullying. Others argue that calls for "cancellation" are themselves a form of free speech, and that they promote accountability, and give disenfranchised people a voice. Still others question whether cancel culture is an actual phenomenon, arguing that similar forms of boycotting have long existed. While the careers of some public figures have been impacted by boycotts that have been widely described as "cancellation", others have complained of cancellation while continuing their careers as before.

Origins
"Call-out culture" has been in use as part of the #MeToo movement. The #MeToo movement encouraged women (and men) to call out their abusers on a forum where the accusations would be heard, especially against very powerful individuals. Additionally, the Black Lives Matter Movement, which seeks to highlight inequalities, racism and discrimination in the black community, repeatedly called out black men being killed by police.

In March 2014, activist Suey Park called out "a blatantly racist tweet about Asians" from the official Twitter account of The Colbert Report using the hashtag #cancelColbert, which generated widespread outrage against Stephen Colbert and an even greater amount of backlash against Park, even though the Colbert Report tweet was a satirical tweet. By around 2015, the concept of canceling had become widespread on Black Twitter to refer to a personal decision, sometimes seriously and sometimes in jest, to stop supporting a person or work. According to Jonah Engel Bromwich of The New York Times, this usage of the word "cancellation" indicates the "total disinvestment in something (anything)". After numerous cases of online shaming gained wide notoriety, the term cancellation was increasingly used to describe a widespread, outraged, online response to a single provocative statement, against a single target. Over time, as isolated instances of cancellation became more frequent and the mob mentality more apparent, commentators began seeing a "culture" of outrage and cancellation.

The phrase cancel culture gained popularity since late 2019, most often as a recognition that society will exact accountability for offensive conduct. Into the 2020s, the phrase has become a shorthand employed by conservatives in the United States to refer to what are perceived to be disproportionate reactions to politically incorrect speech. In 2020, Ligaya Mishan wrote in The New York Times, "The term is shambolically applied to incidents both online and off that range from vigilante justice to hostile debate to stalking, intimidation and harassment. ... Those who embrace the idea (if not the precise language) of canceling seek more than pat apologies and retractions, although it's not always clear whether the goal is to right a specific wrong or redress a larger imbalance of power."

Etymology
The 1981 Chic album Take It Off includes the song "Your Love Is Cancelled", which compares a breakup to the cancellation of TV shows. The song was written by Nile Rodgers following a bad date Rodgers had with a woman who expected him to misuse his celebrity status on her behalf. "Your Love Is Cancelled" inspired screenwriter Barry Michael Cooper to include a reference to a woman being cancelled in the 1991 film New Jack City. This usage introduced the term to African-American Vernacular English, where it eventually became more common.

Academic analysis 
An article written by Pippa Norris, a professor at Harvard University, states that the controversies surrounding cancel culture are between the ones who argue it gives a voice to those in marginalized communities, while the opposing side argues cancel culture is dangerous because it prevents free speech and/or the opportunity for open debate. Norris emphasizes the role of social media in contributing to the rise of cancel culture. Additionally, online communications studies have demonstrated the intensification of cultural wars through activists that are connected through digital and social networking sites. Norris also mentions that the spiral of silence theory may be a contributing factor as to why people are hesitant to voice their own minority views on social media sites in fear that their views and opinions, specifically political opinions, will be chastised because their views violate the majority group's norms and understanding.

In the book The Coddling of the American Mind (2018), social psychologist Jonathan Haidt and free-speech activist Greg Lukianoff argue that call-out culture arises on college campuses from what they term "safetyism"—a moral culture in which people are unwilling to make tradeoffs demanded by the practical or moral concerns of others. Keith Hampton, professor of media studies at Michigan State University, contends that the practice contributes to political polarization in the United States but does not lead to changes in opinion. Cancel culture has been described by media studies scholar Eve Ng as "a collective of typically marginalized voices 'calling out' and emphatically expressing their censure of a powerful figure." Cultural studies scholar Frances E. Lee states that call-out culture leads to self-policing of "wrong, oppressive, or inappropriate" opinions. According to Lisa Nakamura, University of Michigan professor of media studies, canceling someone is a form of "cultural boycott" and cancel culture is the "ultimate expression of agency" which is "born of a desire for control [as] people have limited power over what is presented to them on social media" and a need for "accountability which is not centralized".

Some academics proposed alternatives and improvements to cancel culture. Critical multiculturalism professor Anita Bright proposed "calling in" rather than "calling out" in order to bring forward the former's idea of accountability but in a more "humane, humble, and bridge-building" light. Clinical counsellor Anna Richards, who specializes in conflict mediation, says that "learning to analyze our own motivations when offering criticism" helps call-out culture work productively. Professor Joshua Knobe, of the Philosophy Department at Yale, contends that public denunciation is not effective, and that society is too quick to pass judgement against those they view as public offenders or personae non gratae. Knobe says that these actions have the opposite effect on individuals, and that it is best to bring attention to the positive actions in which most of society participates.

Reactions 
The expression cancel culture has mostly negative connotations and is used in debates on free speech and censorship.

Former US President Barack Obama warned against social media call-out culture, saying: "People who do really good stuff have flaws. People who you are fighting may love their kids and, you know, share certain things with you." Former US President Donald Trump criticized cancel culture in a speech in July 2020, comparing it to totalitarianism and saying that it is a political weapon used to punish and shame dissenters by driving them from their jobs and demanding submission. He was criticized as being hypocritical for having attempted to cancel a number of people and companies in the past himself. Trump made similar claims during the 2020 Republican National Convention when he stated that the goal of cancel culture is to make decent Americans live in fear of being fired, expelled, shamed, humiliated, and driven from society.

Pope Francis said that cancel culture is "a form of ideological colonization, one that leaves no room for freedom of expression", saying that it "ends up cancelling all sense of identity". Patrisse Khan-Cullors, the co-founder of the Black Lives Matter movement, states that social activism does not just involve going online or going to a protest to call someone out, but is work entailing strategy sessions, meetings, and getting petitions signed 

Some argue that cancel culture does have its benefits, such as allowing less powerful people to have a voice, helps marginalized people hold others accountable when the justice system doesn't work, and cancelling is a tool to bring about social change. Lisa Nakamura, a professor at the University of Michigan, describes cancel culture as "a cultural boycott" and says it provides a culture of accountability. Meredith Clark, an assistant professor at the University of Virginia, states that cancel culture gives power to disenfranchised voices. Osita Nwanevu, a staff writer for The New Republic, states that people are threatened by cancel culture because it is a new group of young progressives, minorities, and women who have "obtained a seat at the table" and are debating matters of justice and etiquette.

Open letter 

Dalvin Brown, writing in USA Today, has described an open letter signed by 153 public figures and published in Harper's Magazine as marking a "high point" in the debate on the topic. The letter set out arguments against "an intolerance of opposing views, a vogue for public shaming and ostracism, and the tendency to dissolve complex policy issues in a blinding moral certainty."

A response letter organized by lecturer Arionne Nettles, "A More Specific Letter on Justice and Open Debate", was signed by over 160 people in academia and media. It criticized the Harper's letter as a plea to end cancel culture by successful professionals with large platforms who wanted to exclude others who have been "cancelled for generations.” The writers ultimately stated that the Harper's letter was intended to further silence already marginalized people. They wrote: "It reads as a caustic reaction to a diversifying industry — one that's starting to challenge diversifying norms that have protected bigotry."

American public opinion 
A survey conducted on 10,000 Americans by Pew Research Center asked a series of different questions in regard to cancel culture, specifically on who has heard of the term cancel culture and how Americans define cancel culture. In September 2020, 44% of Americans said that they have at least heard a fair amount about the new phrase, while 22% have heard a great deal and 32% said they have heard nothing at all. 43% Americans aged 18–29 have heard a great deal about cancel culture, compared to only 12% of Americans over the age of 65 who say they have heard a great deal. Additionally, within that same study, the 44% of Americans who had heard a great deal about cancel culture, were then asked how they defined cancel culture. 49% of those Americans state that it describes actions people take to hold others accountable, 14% describe cancel culture as censorship of speech or history, and 12% define it as mean-spirited actions taken to cause others harm. It was found that men were more likely to have heard or know of cancel culture, and that those who identify with the Democratic Party (46%) are more likely to know the term than those in the Republican Party (44%).

A poll of American registered voters conducted by Morning Consult in July 2020 showed that cancel culture, defined as "the practice of withdrawing support for (or canceling) public figures and companies after they have done or said something considered objectionable or offensive", was common: 40% of respondents said they had withdrawn support from public figures and companies, including on social media, because they had done or said something considered objectionable or offensive, with 8% having engaged in this often. Behavior differed according to age, with a majority (55%) of voters 18 to 34 years old saying they have taken part in cancel culture, while only about a third (32%) of voters over 65 said they had joined a social media pile-on. Attitude towards the practice was mixed, with 44% of respondents saying they disapproved of cancel culture, 32% who approved, and 24% who did not know or had no opinion. Furthermore, 46% believed cancel culture had gone too far, with only 10% thinking it had not gone far enough. Additionally, 53% believed that people should expect social consequences for expressing unpopular opinions in public, such as those that may be construed as deeply offensive to other people.

A March 2021 poll by the Harvard Center for American Political Studies and the Harris Poll found that 64% of respondents viewed "a growing cancel culture" as a threat to their freedom, while the other 36% did not. 36% of respondents said that cancel culture is a big problem, 32% called it a moderate problem, 20% called it a small problem, and 13% said it is not a problem. 54% said they were concerned that if they expressed their opinions online, they would be banned or fired, while the other 46% said they were not concerned.

A November 2021 Hill/HarrisX poll found that 71% of registered voters strongly or somewhat felt that cancel culture went too far, with similar numbers of Republicans (76%), Democrats (70%), and independents (68%) saying so. The same poll found that 69% of registered voters felt that cancel culture unfairly punishes people for their past actions or statements, compared to 31% who said it did not. Republicans were more likely to agree with the statement (79%), compared to Democrats (65%) and independents (64%).

Criticism of the concept 
A number of professors, politicians, journalists, and activists question the validity of cancel culture as an actual phenomenon. Connor Garel, writing for Vice, states that cancel culture "rarely has any tangible or meaningful effect on the lives and comfortability of the cancelled." Danielle Kurtzleben, a political reporter for NPR, wrote in 2021 that overuse of the phrase cancel culture in American politics, particularly by Republicans, has made it "arguably background noise". Per Kurtzleben and others, the term has undergone semantic bleaching to lose its original meaning.

Historian C. J. Coventry argues that the term has been incorrectly applied, and that it more accurately reflects the propensity of people to hide historical instances of injustice. Another historian, David Olusoga, made a similar argument, and said it is not limited to the left. Indigenous governance professor and activist Pamela Palmater writes in Maclean's magazine that cancel culture differs from accountability; her article covers the public backlash surrounding Canadian politicians who vacationed during COVID-19, despite pandemic restrictions forbidding such behavior. Former US Secretary of Labor Eugene Scalia says that cancel culture is a form of free speech, and is therefore protected under the First Amendment to the United States Constitution. According to Scalia, cancel culture can interfere with the right to counsel, as some lawyers would not be willing to risk their personal and professional reputation on controversial topics.

Sarah Manavis wrote for the New Statesman magazine that while free speech advocates are more likely to make accusations of cancel culture, criticism is part of free speech and rarely results in consequences for those in power who are criticized. She argues that social media is an extension and reincarnation of a longer tradition of expression in a liberal society, "a new space for historical power structures to be solidified" and that online criticism by people who do not hold actual power in society tends to not affect existing power structures. She adds that most prominent people who criticized public opinion as canceling still have highly profitable businesses and concludes by saying, "So even if you fear the monster under the bed, it will never do you harm. It can't, because it was never there in the first place. Repercussions rarely come for those in power. Why punch down, when you've already won?"

Consequence culture 
Some media commentators including LeVar Burton and Sunny Hostin have stated that cancel culture should be renamed consequence culture. The terms have different connotations: cancel culture focusing on the effect whereby discussion is limited by a desire to maintain one certain viewpoint, whereas consequence culture focuses on the idea that those who write or publish opinions or make statements should bear some responsibility for the effects of these on people.

In popular culture 
The American animated television series South Park mocked cancel culture with its own "#CancelSouthPark" campaign; in promotion of the show's twenty-second season (2018). In the season's third episode, "The Problem with a Poo", there are references to the 2017 documentary The Problem with Apu, the cancellation of Roseanne after a controversial tweet by Roseanne Barr, and the Brett Kavanaugh Supreme Court nomination. In 2019, cancel culture was a primary theme in the stand-up comedy show Sticks & Stones by Dave Chappelle. The 2022 film  Tár was interpreted by several critics as possessing an anti-cancel culture message.

See also 

 Blacklisting
 Culture war
 Deplatforming
 Divestment
 Moral entrepreneur
 Online shaming
 Shunning
 Social exclusion
 
 Woke

Explanatory notes

References

Further reading 
 
 
 
 
 
 
 
 
 
 

2010s neologisms
Boycotts
Internet-related controversies
Political slurs
Social rejection
Shunning